Arrëz is a village in the Korçë County, southeastern Albania. At the 2015 local government reform it became part of the municipality Devoll.

References

Populated places in Devoll (municipality)
Villages in Korçë County